Liu Zongzhou (1578–1645), also known as Liu Jishan, was a Confucian scholar from the Ming dynasty, born in Shanyin, Shaoxing.  He is considered the last master of Song-Ming Neo-Confucianism and is known for his criticism of the teachings of Wang Yangming. After the Ming dynasty was destroyed by the Qing dynasty, Liu Zongzhou died on 8 June of the self-imposed starvation at age 68. 

One of his students Zhu Yuan (祝淵) committed suicide by hanging himself. Another one of his students Wang Yushi (王毓蓍) committed suicide by drowning himself. 

Along with Hu Hong, Liu Zongzhou's thoughts are regarded as part of a third stream of Neo-Confucianism by Mou Zongsan.

References

Ming dynasty scholars
Chinese Confucianists
1578 births
1645 deaths
17th-century Chinese philosophers